Cumbria Archive Service serves the English county of Cumbria. Rather than having just one county record office, Cumbria County Council operates four local record offices, now known as archive centres, in  Barrow-in-Furness, Carlisle, Kendal and Whitehaven.

The four archive centres

Carlisle Archive Centre was officially opened in 1962, although archives had been collected before that date and archive staff had been appointed from c.1944 onwards.  For many years, it operated from the Alma Block within the grounds of Carlisle Castle.  It moved to newly converted premises at Petteril Bank House, on the south side of the city and about two miles from its centre, in 2011.  Important collections include family and estate records of the Earls of Lonsdale from the 12th-20th centuries.  The staff provide administrative assistance for the Egremont Estate Office at Cockermouth Castle.

Kendal Archive Centre was also established in 1962 under a joint archives committee for the former counties of Cumberland and Westmorland and the City of Carlisle.  Few archives other than local authority records had been collected before this date.  The office operates from the main County Offices in the town.  Important collections include Appleby Castle estate records (containing papers relating to Lady Anne Clifford, 1590-1676), and the business records of Thomas Mawson, landscape architect, 19th-20th centuries.

Barrow Archive Centre was opened in purpose-built premises in 1979 (following local government reorganisation and the creation of the new county of Cumbria).  Records had been collected locally in temporary premises at Dalton-in-Furness since 1975 and the new office also absorbed records from the Furness Collection, gathered from 1948 onwards by the Central Library in Barrow. Following building extensions the record office joined with the local studies library in 1998 to provide a unified service within a joint search room.  Important collections include records from the Furness estate office of the Duke of Buccleuch.

Whitehaven Archive and Local Studies Centre was officially opened within specially converted premises in August 1996.  It collects archives mainly from the south and west portions of the former county of Cumberland.

All four archive centres are recognised by the Lord Chancellor as places of deposit for public records.  They are also designated as diocesan record offices by the Bishop of Carlisle.  A specialist unit for the conservation and repair of records operates from within the archive centre at Petteril Bank House, Carlisle.

References

External links
Website
CASCAT online catalogue

See also
Anna Dean

Archives in Cumbria
History of Cumbria
Organisations based in Cumbria
County record offices in England